Hasanchak (Barh), is a village in Barh, Patna District, Bihar, India. The Ganga River flows close to the village.

Location
Hasanchak is located on the Barhi-Guwahati National Highway. The village is 62 km east of Patna, the capital city of the state and district headquarters. It is part of the Patna – Mokama stretch. The nearest cities are [Barh] (5 km east)  [Athmalgola] (3 km west) and [Bakhtiyarpur] (8km west) The nearest railway station is located in Barh, and the nearest airport is jpn Airport.

Population
The population of Hasanchak is 3030 (1400 female and 1630 male). There is a 78% educational qualification in the village.

References

External links
 Bihar website
 Patna website

Villages in Patna district